The Chinese Ambassador to Morocco is the official representative of the People's Republic of China to the Kingdom of Morocco.

History
In the Chinese consulate in Oujda, diplomatic relations with the National Liberation Front in Morocco were established.

List of representatives

References 

 
Morocco
China